A moment magnitude 7.5–7.6 earthquake struck offshore near the Tanimbar Islands, Maluku, Indonesia, at a depth of 105.1 km, on 10 January 2023.

Tectonic setting
Tectonic activity in North Maluku is filled with subduction and strike-slip fault lines. Intermediate to deep focus earthquakes with a focal depth of 60 km or greater are considered too deep to directly generate a significant tsunami. The 1938 Banda Sea earthquake, an intermediate depth magnitude 8.5–8.6 event, caused a relatively small tsunami []. The most recent major earthquake prior to the 2023 event occurred in December 2021, measuring a magnitude of 7.3. The region around Saumlaki has experienced earthquakes of intensities between IV (Light) to VI (Strong) in 1920, 1995, 2006, and 2009.

Earthquake
The earthquake occurred at 02:47 WIT and had a magnitude of 7.5, according to the Meteorology, Climatology, and Geophysical Agency (BMKG), while the United States Geological Survey and the European-Mediterranean Seismological Centre reported a magnitude of 7.6.

Intensity
According to the BMKG, the earthquake was felt with a maximum intensity of VI (Strong) in parts of Yamdena, with intensity V (Moderate) being felt in the town of Saumlaki. It was also felt with an intensity of IV (Light) in the cities of Sorong, Kaimana, Waingapu, Waijelu and Tiakur, and the islands of Alor and Lembata.

Tsunami
The Meteorology, Climatology, and Geophysical Agency had issued a tsunami warning for the region, which was later cancelled. Ecuadorian and Chilean officials said there was no tsunami threat to their countries. The tsunami triggered by the earthquake only reached  in Seira, Tanimbar Islands.

Ground effects
Off the northern coast of Yamdena, an "island" was reported to have emerged from the sea shortly after the earthquake. This triggered panic among residents, leading to a nearby village being temporarily evacuated. Officials said that phenomenon was likely an eruption of a mud volcano, and similar phenomena have been observed in 1945, 1952, 1957, 2001, 2004, and 2013.

Impact
A diver was killed after being struck by rocks and coral during a dive, however the BNPB said the person did not die during the earthquake, nor was it related. Four others were slightly injured, 15 houses collapsed, and 523 others sustained light to heavy damage in the Tanimbar Islands. In the neighbouring Southwest Maluku Regency, 344 houses and several schools were damaged, 39 of them severely. At least seven residents were also injured there. At least two schools, seven health facilities, twelve churches, and eight government buildings were also affected. In Selaru, three houses sustained repairable damages, while the wall of a high school collapsed. A hotel that was once occupied by the President of Indonesia was also badly damaged. Electricity was also disrupted. In total, around 400 people were left homeless by the earthquake.

The earthquake was felt as far away as East Timor and northern Australia. Reports of the quake described it as being a strong and long-lasting tremor, with some people saying that their whole house was shaking and that they could hear the earth rumbling.

See also

List of earthquakes in 2023
List of earthquakes in Indonesia

References

Notes

Citations

2023 earthquakes
January 2023 events in Australia
January 2023 events in Indonesia
Earthquakes in Australia
Earthquakes in Indonesia
Tanimbar Islands
2023 earthquake